Bologna is a city in Italy.

Bologna may also refer to:

Places
the Province of Bologna
Bologne, Haute-Marne, France

People
 Andrea da Bologna, Italian painter
 Antonio Beccadelli di Bologna (1475-1513), Italian aristocrat
 Bartolomeo da Bologna (1405-1427), Italian composer
 Cristoforo da Bologna, Italian painter
 David Bologna (born 1994), American actor
 Domenico Bologna (1845-1885), Italian painter
 Enrique Bologna (born 1982), Argentina football player
 Ferdinando Bologna (1925-2019), Italian art critic
 Giambologna (1529–1608), Italian sculptor otherwise (incorrectly) known as Giovanni da Bologna
 Giuseppe Bologna (1634-1697), Italian archbishop
 Jack Bologna (1775-1846), Italian actor
 Jacopo da Bologna (fl 1340–1360), Italian composer
 Joseph Bologna (1934–2017), American actor
 Julie Bologna, American television meteorologist
 Maria Beccadelli di Bologna (1848-1929), Italian salon-holder
 Michele di Matteo da Bologna (died 1469), Italian painter
 Niccolò da Bologna (1325-1403), Italian illuminator
 Orazio Antonio Bologna (born 1945), Italian author
 Paola Bologna (born 1889), Italian tennis player
 Ugo Bologna (1917-1998), Italian actor
 Vitale da Bologna (1289-1361), Italian painter

Other
 the 1980 Bologna massacre
Bologna declaration
Bologna Process in European higher education, named for the declaration
Bologna sausage
Bologna (Rome Metro)
Bologna F.C. 1909, a major association football club based in Bologna, Italy
25 Motorised Division Bologna an infantry division of Italy during World War II

See also
Baloney (disambiguation)
Bologne (disambiguation)
Bolognese (disambiguation)
Bologa
Balogna